Nathalie Poza Maupain (born 7 March 1972) is a Spanish actress.  Her credits include Todas las mujeres, Hispania, la leyenda, Football Days, Un lugar en el mundo and The Weakness of the Bolshevik.

Early life

She was born in Madrid, the daughter of a French mother and a Spanish father, and studied at a British bilingual school. From a young age, she learned to play the piano and practiced ballet.

Career

Her ex-partner, Gonzalo de Castro, has also been linked to Animalario.

In her first fixed television role in 2001, she played Nerea in Policías, en el corazón de la calle.

Her first cinematographic works were the short films Abierto (El eco del tiempo) (1997), by Jaime Marques; No sé, no sé (1998), by Aitor Gaizka and Ruth está bien (1999), by Pablo Valiente.

In 2013, the film  premiered, directed by Mariano Barroso, for which she received her third Goya nomination, for best supporting actress. In 2015 she joined the series Carlos, rey emperador, where she plays Germaine of Foix.

Filmography

Short films

Feature films

Television

Theater

Awards and nominations

Goya Awards

|-
|2003
|Football Days
|Best New Actress
|
|-
|2005
|Malas temporadas
|Best Actress
|
|-
|2013
|Todas las mujeres
|Best Supporting Actress
|
|-
|2017
|Can't Say Goodbye
|Best Actress
|
|-
|2019
|While at War
|Best Supporting Actress
|
|-
|2020
|Rosa's Wedding
|Best Supporting Actress
|

Actors Union Awards

|-
!scope="row" rowspan="2"|
!scope="row" rowspan="2"|Football Days
|
|
|-
|
|
|-
|
|Malas temporadas
|
|
|-
|
|LEX
|
|
|-
|
|Carlos, rey emperador
|
|

References

External links
 

1972 births
Living people
Spanish film actresses
Spanish television actresses
Spanish stage actresses
Actresses from Madrid
20th-century Spanish actresses
21st-century Spanish actresses
Best Actress Goya Award winners
Best Supporting Actress Goya Award winners